The Tower Building is a historic high-rise building, located at 1401 K Street, Northwest, Washington, D.C., United States and is the seventh-tallest commercial building in Washington, D.C.

History
It is currently the 10th-tallest building in Washington, D.C. The architect who designed the building was Robert F. Beresford. Other firms that participated in the creation of the building were Bates Warren, WDG Architecture, PLLC, and Harkins Builders, Inc. When completed in 1929, the Tower Building was the first Art Deco office building in Washington, D.C. and was created after the inspiration of the Art Deco exhibition in Paris in 1926. The Tower Building was the city's tallest high-rise at the time of completion in 1929. In 1995, this building was added to the National Register of Historic Places

See also
List of tallest buildings in Washington, D.C.

References

External links
 

Office buildings completed in 1929
Art Deco architecture in Washington, D.C.
Office buildings on the National Register of Historic Places in Washington, D.C.
Skyscraper office buildings in Washington, D.C.
1929 establishments in Washington, D.C.